Jaap Tamino van Dissel (born 29 April 1957) is a Dutch virologist and infectiologist.

He is also professor at the Leiden University with specialization Internal Medicine, in particular infectious diseases.


Life
Van Dissel was born on 29 April 1957 in Amsterdam. He obtained his doctorate at Leiden University in 1987 with a thesis titled: "Divergent bactericidal activity of resident and activated macrophages for Salmonella typhimurium and Listeria monocytogenes". He became a professor of internal medicine, in particular infectious diseases, at Leiden University in 2000.

COVID-19 pandemic 
He has received criticism from colleagues and international equivalents, as done by his American equivalent Anthony Fauci after Van Dissel advised against usage of cloth face masks. At that time van Dissel feared that his fellow citizens could assume wearing cloth face masks as the only and seemingly sufficient measure and ignore all the other hygiene measures.

On 6 May 2021 it was announced that van Dissel would receive the Academy Medal of the Royal Netherlands Academy of Arts and Sciences on 31 May 2021 for his work as scientific advisor during the COVID-19 pandemic.

References

1957 births
Living people
COVID-19 pandemic in the Netherlands
Dutch virologists
Leiden University alumni
Academic staff of Leiden University
Physicians from Amsterdam